The Central Riverina Football League was a minor Australian rules football competition which ran from 1949 until 1981 in the Riverina region of New South Wales. The league contained a number of historic clubs, many of which no longer exist.

History
There was a Central Riverina Football League that was formed in 1907 in Narrandra, that was made up from the Coolamon, Hay and Narrandra football clubs.

The Central Riverina Football League (CRFL) was formed in 1949 at the annual general meeting of the Milbrulong & District Football League, when it was decided to change its name to the Central Riverina Football League.

The Milbrulong Football Association was reformed in 1945, after a five-year break due to World War Two and was active up until 1948, when the name change took place in early 1949.

In 1946, Boree Creek and Collingullie joined the Milbrulong & DFL from the Lockhart & District Football League.

In 1947 and 1948, some clubs arranged reserve grade matches against other teams, but there was no official competition.

At the 1948 AGM, Mr. Albert Ziebell (Railway Hotel, Lockhart) promised £3/3/ towards the trophy for the best and fairest player in the CRFL.

At the 1949 AGM, Mr. T Brennan of Milbrulong donated £10/10/ towards a cup for the best and fairest player in the CRFL, to be known as the Brennan Cup.

On Wednesday, 12 September 1951, Hawthorn: 20.15 - 135 defeated the Central Riverina Football League: 6.6 - 42, which was played at Lockhart.

The CRFL Reserves / Second eighteen competition was introduced into the CRFL in the late 1950s.

Osborne played in ten grand finals between 1945 and 1961, winning four premierships, while East Wagga played in eight grand final between 1967 and 1976, for four premierships.

In 1982 the CRFL merged with the South West Football League (New South Wales) and the old Farrer Football League to form the Riverina Football Netball League and the Riverina District Football League.

It was between 1983 and 1994 that the Riverina District Football League / Farrer Football League maintained a two division system.

The Riverina District Football League changed its name to the Farrer Football League in 1985.

Football Clubs
Milbrulong & District Football League (1945 - 1948)
 Boree Creek: "Magpies" 1946 - 1948. Joined the Central Riverina FL in 1949.
 Collingullie: - 1946 - 1948. Joined the Central Riverina FL in 1949.
 Lockhart: 1945 - 1948. Joined the Central Riverina FL in 1949.
 Milbrulong: 1945 - 1948. Joined the Central Riverina FL in 1949.
 Mittagong: 1945 - 1948. Joined the Central Riverina FL in 1949.
 Osborne: 1945 - 1948. Joined the Central Riverina FL in 1949.
 Pleasant Hills: 1948. Joined the Central Riverina FL in 1949.
 The Rock: 1945 - 1947. Joined the Albury & District Football League in 1948.
 Yerong Creek: 1945 - 1948. Joined the Central Riverina FL in 1949.

 Central Riverina Football League (1949 - 1981)
 Army (Kapooka) "Cats": 1958 - 1972 & 1975 - 81: Merged with Junee in 1982 & joined the Riverina District Football League.
 Barellan "Kangaroos: 1973 - 81. Joined the Riverina Football League in 1982.
 Boree Creek: 1949 - 1969 & 1980 - 1981. Played in the Hume Football League 1970 - 1975. Played in the Coreen & District Football League 1976 - 1978
 Collingullie "Demons": 1949 - 1964. Joined the Farrer Football League in 1965.
 Cootamundra "Blues": 1960 - 1980. Joined the South West Football League (New South Wales) in 1981
 East Wagga Saints: 1959 - 1976: Joined the Farrer Football League in 1977.
 RAAF (Forest Hill) "Cats". 1962 - 19?? & 1977 - 1981. Joined the Riverina District Football League in 1982 - 1996. Merged with North Wagga Saints in 1997.
 Junee "Bulldogs": 1958 - 1981. Merged with Army in 1982 & joined the Riverina District Football League.
 Lockhart "Bombers": 1949 - 1956. Joined the Albury & District Football League in 1957.
 Marian Dons: 1971 -
 Marrar "Bombers" 1957 - 1981. Joined the Riverina District Football League in 1982.
 Milbrulong 1949 - 1958. Club disbanded.
 Mittagong 1949. Withdrew from the CRFL at 1950 AGM due to insufficient players.
 Osborne 1949 - 1969. Joined the Hume Football League in 1970.
 Pleasant Hills 1949 - 1953. Withdrew at 1954 CRFL - AGM due to insufficient players.
 Riverina College of Advanced Education: 1972 - 1981. - "Bush Pigs":
 South Wagga-Tolland Dons:
 Temora "Kangaroos": 1957 - 1960. Joined the Farrer Football League in 1961.
 Tumut 1970 - 1977: Joined the Upper Murray Football League in 1978.
 Turvey Park: 1955. Joined the South West Football League in 1956 and played there until 1981.
 Uranquinty "Rosellas": 1950 - 1952.
 Wagga
 Whitton "Tigers" 1979 - 1981. Joined the Riverina District Football League in 1982.
 Yerong Creek: 1949 - 1955. Joined the Albury & District Football League in 1955, then Yerong Creek merged with The Rock in 1962 & remained in the A&DFL.
 Young: 1976 - 1977. Young joined the Northern Riverina FL in 1978.

Football Grand Finals
Seniors

Seniors
1985: The Riverina District Football League changed its name to the Farrer Football League in 1985 and maintained a Farrer FL Division One competition & Farrer FL Division Two competition up until 1994.

Central Riverina Football League
Reserves

1946: Mittagong
1947: Yerong Creek: 7.7 - 49 d Mittagong: 5.6 - 36
1948: RAAF: 8.8 - 56 drew Central Riverina FL U/21: 8.8 - 56 (curtain raiser)
1949: Albury & District Football League: 7.12 - 54 drew Central Riverina FL: 9.0 - 54 (curtain raiser)
1952: Lockhart v MIlbrulong
1953: Osborne v Milbrulong 
1959: Army: 13.8 - 86 d Temora: 9.8 - 62
1960: East Wagga: 7.6 - 48 d Junee: 2.3 - 15
1961: Junee d RAAF
1962: Army d RAAF
1963: Army d RAAF
1964: RAAF d Cootamundra
1965: RAAF d Army
1966: Marrar d East Wagga
1967: Army d East Wagga
1968: Army d Junee
1969: Army d RAAF

1970: East Wagga d Cootamundra
1971: Army d East Wagga
1972: East Wagga d RAAF
1973: East Wagga d RAAF
1974: East Wagga: 56 d Cootamundra: 46
1975: East Wagga d RAAF
1976: East Wagga d RAAF
1977: Barellan United d Marain Dons
1978: Marrar d South Wagga Tollard
1979: Barellan United d Marrar
1980: Barellan United d Junee
1981:

Riverina DISTRICT Football League (1982)
Reserves 
1982: Junee: 9.18 - 72 d TRYC: 7.11 - 53

Central Riverina FL - Most Senior Premierships / Runners Up (1949 - 1981)

 1946 - 1950: Senior Premiership Cup: Donald Ross Cup
 1946 - 1953: Reserves Premiership Cup: Cooper Cup 
 RCAE - Riverina College of Advanced Education

Leading Goalkickers 
1976 - P. Carroll - East Wagga - 113
1977 - Rod Milthorpe - Cootamundra - 82
1978 - B. Spencer - Junee - 72
1979 - C. Griffiths - RAAF - 62
1980 - C. Eaton - Cootamundra - 82
1981 - Neil Diggleman - Barellan United - 54

Best & Fairest Award
Senior Football
Brennan Cup (1949)
Coghill Medal

1985 - RDFL changed its name to the Farrer FL.

Officer Bearers

References

Links
Albury & District Football League
Australian rules football in New South Wales
Central Hume Football Association
Coreen & District Football League
Farrer Football League
Hume Football Netball League
Riverina Football Association
Riverina Football Netball League
South West Football League (New South Wales)
Central Riverina FL - "CRFL Weekly Record"

Defunct Australian rules football competitions in New South Wales
Sport in the Riverina
Sports leagues established in 1949
1949 establishments in Australia
1981 disestablishments in Australia